The 2010 World Judo Championships were held at the Yoyogi National Gymnasium in Tokyo, Japan from 9 to 13 September.

Schedule

Medal summary

Men's events

Women's events

Medal table

References 

 
World Judo Championships
World Championships
World Championships
World Championships 2010
Judo World Championships
Judo World Championships
Judo World Championships
Judo World Championships
Judo World Championships